Harold Raymond Steele,  (June 9, 1929January 28, 2022) was a Canadian businessman.  He had business ventures in transportation, hotels and radio, most notably Newfoundland Capital Corporation and Eastern Provincial Airways.

Early life
Steele was born in Musgrave Harbour, Dominion of Newfoundland, on June 9, 1929.  He studied at Memorial University of Newfoundland, graduating with a Bachelor of Education in 1953.  He then joined the Royal Canadian Navy to meet his obligations with the University Naval Training Division, the program that helped fund his education.  He quickly rose to the rank of lieutenant commander and was assigned to Washington, D.C., as a military attaché for four years.  He was subsequently put in charge of the new military communications research centre in Gander in 1970, before retiring four years later after 24 years of service.

Career
Steele started investing in the stock market during the late 1950s, when he was a teacher at the Maritime Warfare School in Halifax.  He also ventured into real estate, purchasing the Albatross Hotel in Gander with his wife during a bankruptcy sale around that time.  Shortly before retiring from the navy, he started purchasing shares in Eastern Provincial Airways (EPA), which was losing money at the time.  Steele foresaw that the provincial government's newly announced hydro projects in Labrador would bring about more demand for flights to the region.  He briefly served as its vice-president of marketing, before purchasing 67% of the airline's shares to become its majority shareholder in the mid-1970s.  He introduced numerous reforms to EPA, which included reducing the number of flight attendants by a third, staving off pilots' strikes and threats of strike from other personnel, successfully lobbying to obtain a portion of the Halifax–Toronto direct route from rivals CP Air, and introducing a profit-sharing plan for employees.  He ultimately sold the company to CP Air in 1984 for C$20 million, reversing the $815,000 operating loss EPA recorded the year he purchased it.

Steele established Newfoundland Capital Corporation (NCC) in 1981.  During the early 1980s, he bought the Q Radio network.  He subsequently obtained a controlling interest in Halifax Daily News in 1984, before buying CHTN-FM in Charlottetown two years later.  In a surprise move, he acquired the VOCM Radio Network during the late 1990s.  He was succeeded as chairman of NCC by his son Rob in 2000.  The company subsequently sold its assets in printing and publishing two years later, enabling Steele to withdraw from its day-to-day management and retire.  However, NCC retained its radio assets until November 2018, when they were sold to Stingray Digital Group for $523 million.  In a separate transaction, Steele purchased $25 million worth of shares in Stingray.

Despite retiring, Steele continued to visit the Albatross Hotel whenever he was in town until around 2018.  The hotel ultimately remained under his ownership until his death.  He also owned Universal Helicopters for over three decades until selling it in 2013.

Awards and honours
Steele was appointed an officer of the Order of Canada in November 1991 and invested in April of the following year.  The community centre in Gander is named in his honour.

Personal life
Steele was married to Catherine Thornhill until his death.  She was a music teacher and graduate of Mount Allison University, and they met while he was studying at Memorial University.  Together, they had three children: Peter, Rob, and John.

Steele resided in Gander in his retirement.  He died on January 28, 2022, in St. John's, Newfoundland and Labrador.  He was 92 years old.

See also
 List of people of Newfoundland and Labrador

References

Citations

General references

External links
 Newspaper The Independent article
 Business Hall of Fame member

1929 births
2022 deaths
Businesspeople from Newfoundland and Labrador
Canadian mass media owners
Canadian people of British descent
Memorial University of Newfoundland alumni
Officers of the Order of Canada
People from Newfoundland (island)